The TEN Tenors (also known as TTT) are an Australian music ensemble that has toured worldwide, been seen by more than 90 million people and attracted a vast international fan-base by performing a unique combination of classical and contemporary music featuring ten-part harmonies. 

First formed in 1995, the group has headlined more than 2000 concerts around the world (including North, Central and South America, Europe, Asia, Africa and New Zealand, 29 countries to date), sold more than 3.5 million concert tickets and become renowned for their dynamic, choreographed performances and skillful ability to seamlessly transition from operatic arias to soulful ballads through to chart-topping pop and rock songs. 

They have also been widely praised in the media, with The New York Times saying their “unique mix of the traditional and unconventional offers a fresh and highly-original take on the staid traditions of opera” and Variety describing them as “truly incandescent when performing at the full strength of 10”.

They have shared the stage with artists including Lionel Richie, Rod Stewart, Andrea Bocelli, Willie Nelson, Alanis Morissette and Christina Aguilera. They have also appeared extensively on TV, including The Today Show, Today, Oprah’s Australian Adventure, and Extreme Makeover: Home Edition, as well as the Jerry Lewis MDA Telethon for an audience of 32 million viewers and the UEFA Euro 2012 in Warsaw, Poland.

They have recorded extensively over the past 20 years, earning platinum and gold records,

Current members
Cameron Barclay
Daniel Belle
Michael Edwards
Keane Fletcher
Paul Gelsumini
Nathan Lay
Jared Newall
Boyd Owen
JD Smith
James Watkinson
Nigel Huckle (stand-by)
Band
Benjamin Kiehne (Piano)
Trent Bryson-Dean (Drums)
Joey McCoy (Guitar)

Note: The roster of members does change – the above list is current as at March 2019.

Creatives
Director/Producer: D-J Wendt
Supervising Musical Director: Dr Steven Baker
Touring Musical Director-in-Residence: Michael Edwards
Assistant Touring Musical Director-in-Residence: Paul Gelsumini
Lighting Designer: Jamie Schmidt
Staging/Choreography: Keane Fletcher

Previous members

 Craig  Atkinson
 Robert Barbaro
 Daniel Belle
 Thomas David Birch
 Shannon Brown
 Shaun Brown
 Nick Carter
 Benjamin Clark
 Roger Davy
 Scott Fields
 Graham Foote
 George Forgan-Smith
 Jack Fowles
 Lucas Gelsumini 
 Drew Graham
 Gordon Harris
 Craig Hendry
 Matthew Hickey
 Chad Hilligus
 Garry Jones
 Luke Kennedy
 David Kidd
 Kim Kirkman 
 Nathan Kneen
 Rosario La Spina
 Adrian Li Donni
 Adam Lopez
 Bradley McCaw
 Liam McLachlan
 Sebastian Maclaine
 Kent Maddock
 Dion Molinas
 Greg Moore
 Stewart Morris
 Joseph Naim
 Boyd Owen
 Adrian Phillips
 Josh Piterman
 Jordan S. Pollard
 Andrew Pryor
 Sam Roberts-Smith
 Kyle Sapsford
 Jason Short
 Dominic Smith
 Steve Sowden
 Tod Strike
 Jeff Teale
 Jason Turnbull
 Florian Voss
 Bernard Wheaton

Discography

Studio albums

Live albums 

° Australian Music DVD Chart.

Compilation albums

Video albums

Awards

Mo Awards
The Australian Entertainment Mo Awards (commonly known informally as the Mo Awards), were annual Australian entertainment industry awards. They recognise achievements in live entertainment in Australia from 1975 to 2016. The Ten Tenors won one awards in that time.
 (wins only)
|-
| 2003
| The Ten Tenors
| Vocal of the Year
| 
|-

References

External links

Opera crossover singers
Tenor vocal groups
Culture of Brisbane